Ayyanar is a 2010 Indian Tamil-language action drama film written and directed by Rajamithran and produced by P. L. Thenappan. The film stars Aadhi and Meera Nandan with  Vishnu Priyan, Rajashree, Santhanam and Anupama Kumar playing supporting roles. The film was released on 10 December 2010 to mixed reviews and was an Average at the box office.

Plot
Prabha (Aadhi) is the eldest son of his family who does nothing but spend all his time with his friends. He is chastised by his father (Jayaprakash) for that. Being a volleyball player comes to his rescue as he finds a part-time job as a volleyball coach in a women's college. His younger brother Saravanan (Vishnu Priyan) works in a TV channel, and Prabha is often compared to him by the family, which incurs his wrath. The siblings cross swords with each other. One day, Saravanan  is killed, and the blame falls on Prabha. He is on the run and soon joins a goonda working as a henchman to an influential politician (Mahadevan). Prabha goes on a killing spree, killing one by one in the gang. Finally, a flashback reveals that they were the reason for Saravanan's death.

Cast
 Aadhi as Prabha/Ayyanar
 Meera Nandan as Anitha
 Vishnu Priyan as Saravanan
 Santhanam as Shiva, Prabha's friend
 Arpit Ranka as Ramani
 Mahadevan as Politician
 Jayaprakash as Prabha and Saravanan's father
 Anupama Kumar as Prabha and Saravanan's mother
 Rajashree as Prabha's aunt
 Ravi Kale
 S. S. Kumaran

Production
Aadhi suffered a minor injury on his knee, while a fight scene was being picturised on the terrace of an under-construction apartment building, near the Gemini Flyover in Chennai.

The fight was to be choreographed in the night effect as per the script. Fight master Super Subbarayan choreographed this stunt featuring the hero (Aadhi) fighting the three villains of the film Ravi Kale, 'Pithamagan' Mahadevan and Arpit.

Soundtrack

Film score and the soundtrack are composed by Thaman.  "Aathadi Aathadi" received a high response from audience.

Release and Reception
One month after its release, it was telecasted on Vijay TV during Pongal.

The film received mixed reviews. Behindwoods wrote:"Ayyanar stands in the passable league that can gratify the audiences, who are least, bothered about logics". Sify wrote:"On the whole, Ayyanar is a mass film that is found wanting in tempo and packaging".

References

External links
 

2010 films
2010s Tamil-language films
Indian action drama films
Films scored by Thaman S
2010 action drama films